Salah ed-Dine El-Ouadie ( Salah ed-Diin el-Wadii) is a Moroccan poet and human rights activist. He is the president and founder of Damir.

Studies 
He was born August, 1952 in either Asfi or Rabat. He earned a degree in philosophy in 1982, then a degree in political science from Montpellier in 1987. He was imprisoned at the secret Derb Moulay Sherif Prison in Hay Mohammadi, Casablanca during the Years of Lead under the reign of Hassan II.

Human rights 
Member of the Equity and Reconciliation Commission and former detainee of Derb Mulay Sherif Prison, Salah el-Ouadie identified Qadour el-Youssfi—a member of the Moroccan delegation that affirmed before the UN in Geneva that there was no torture in Morocco—as the main torturer and man in charge of Derb Mulay Sherif Prison when el-Ouadie was there. In accordance with the official policy of the Equity and Reconciliation Commission of addressing the hardships of the victims without harming the aggressors, el-Ouadie did not publicly reveal the name of the official, though he did address him in a famous open letter, Lettre ouverte à mon tortionnaire.

Career 
In 1997, he was hired as a professor at the Upper School of Management and Entrepreneurship in Casablanca. He did not cease his literary activity, and began organizing and presenting the program Moment of Poetry ( Lahdhat Shi3r) on the 2M TV channel from 2000 to 2002.

He remained an active member of civil society, through work in associations and NGOs such as the Moroccan Organization for Human Rights, which he co-founded in 1988, as well as the Moroccan Forum for Truth and Justice. He also received an honor from King Muhammad VI on behalf of his late aunt, the judge and human rights activist Assia el Ouadie.

Works 
The Wound of the Bare Chest جراح الصدر العاري 1985

There is Still Something in the Heart Worth of Attention مازال في القلب شيء يستحق الانتباه 1988

The Groom العريس a novel 1998

References

Moroccan male poets
Moroccan human rights activists
Living people
1952 births